Dennis Marschall (born 15 August 1996) is a German racing driver who currently competes in the ADAC GT Masters.

Career

Early career
Marschall began his racing career in karting at the age of 11, competing until 2013. He spent most of his karting career in the ADAC Kart Masters series, finishing as high as second in the KF3 class in 2010. In 2014, he stepped into single-seater racing, competing in the ADAC Formel Masters series for the Lotus-branded Motopark Academy team. Marschall would finish sixth in his opening season in the series with three race victories to his credit; one at EuroSpeedway Lausitz in May alongside a pair of victories at the Hockenheimring to close the season.

Sports car racing

2015 saw Marschall leave the single-seater ranks after just one season, electing to compete in the opening season of the Audi Sport TT Cup. In two seasons of competition in the series, Marschall collected seven victories and fourteen podiums, finishing third and second in the overall championship before joining Aust Motorsport for the 2017 ADAC GT Masters season. In June of that year, Marschall joined the BMW Junior Program. As a result, Marschall moved to BMW Team Schnitzer for the 2018 ADAC GT Masters season, driving alongside Victor Bouveng. The duo would finish 28th in points, collecting a lone podium at the Red Bull Ring. The following season, Marschall joined Rutronik Racing, partnering with Carrie Schreiner. At Hockenheim in September, Marschall scored his first pole in the series, which he converted to the duo's only podium finish of the season.

For the 2021 season, Marschall was promoted to Audi factory driver status. In 2023, Marschall took on a full-time drive in the Pro class of the GT World Challenge Europe Endurance Cup, driving for Tresor Orange1 alongside fellow factory drivers Mattia Drudi and Ricardo Feller.

Racing record

Career summary

* Season still in progress.

Complete GT World Challenge Europe Endurance Cup results

* Season still in progress.

Complete GT World Challenge Europe Sprint Cup results

References

External links
Dennis Marschall at GT World Challenge Europe Official Website

1996 births
Living people
German racing drivers
ADAC Formel Masters drivers
Blancpain Endurance Series drivers
ADAC GT Masters drivers
Sportspeople from Karlsruhe
Audi Sport TT Cup drivers
Audi Sport drivers
Schnitzer Motorsport drivers
W Racing Team drivers
Phoenix Racing drivers
Motopark Academy drivers
Nürburgring 24 Hours drivers
GT4 European Series drivers